Num Lock or Numeric Lock (⇭) is a key on the numeric keypad of most computer keyboards. It is a lock key, like Caps Lock and Scroll Lock. Its state affects the function of the numeric keypad commonly located to the right of the main keyboard and is commonly displayed by an LED built into the keyboard.

The Num Lock key exists because earlier 84-key IBM PC keyboards did not have cursor control or arrows separate from the numeric keypad. Most earlier computer keyboards had different number keys and cursor control keys; however, to reduce cost, IBM chose to combine the two in their early PC keyboards. Num Lock would be used to select between the two functions. On some laptop computers, the Num Lock key is used to convert part of the main keyboard to act as a (slightly skewed) numeric keypad rather than letters. On some laptop computers, the Num Lock key is absent and replaced by the use of a key combination.

Since Apple Keyboards never had a combination of arrow keys and numeric keypad (but some lacked arrow keys, function keys, and a numeric keypad altogether), Apple has keyboards with a separate numeric keypad but no functional Num Lock key. Keyboards manufactured by Apple will instead use a  Clear key but not all Apple manufactured keyboards will be provided with it.

References

Lock keys